Tarvastu Parish was a rural municipality of Estonia, in Viljandi County. It had a population of 4,216 (as of 1 January 2009) and an area of 409.00 km².

Settlements
Small borough
Mustla
Villages
Ämmuste – Anikatsi – Jakobimõisa – Järveküla – Kalbuse – Kannuküla – Kärstna – Kivilõppe – Koidu – Kuressaare – Maltsa – Marjamäe – Metsla – Mõnnaste – Muksi – Pahuvere – Pikru – Põrga – Porsa – Raassilla – Riuma – Roosilla – Soe – Sooviku – Suislepa – Tagamõisa – Tarvastu – Tinnikuru – Ülensi – Unametsa – Väluste – Vanausse – Veisjärve – Vilimeeste – Villa – Vooru

See also
Järveküla Nature Reserve
Õhne river
Suislepa Airfield
Tarvastu Castle
Veisjärv
Võrtsjärv

References

External links
 

Former municipalities of Estonia